Fuchsia hypoleuca is a species of plant in the family Onagraceae. It is endemic to Ecuador.

References

hypoleuca
Endemic flora of Ecuador
Endangered plants
Taxonomy articles created by Polbot